Pine Grove is an unincorporated community in St. Helena Parish, Louisiana, United States. The community has a post office with ZIP code 70453.

References

Unincorporated communities in St. Helena Parish, Louisiana
Unincorporated communities in Louisiana